Jane Marriott  (born 1976 in Doncaster, England) is a British diplomat. Marriott was the Director of the Joint International Counter-Terrorism Unit. She was appointed the British High Commissioner to Kenya, and began her consular duties in the Summer of 2019.

Marriott graduated from Durham University in 1997 with a first-class degree in History, and went on to complete an MPhil in International Relations at Darwin College, Cambridge.

Career
From 2013 to 2015 she was British Ambassador to Yemen. Marriott formerly served as an adviser to Richard Holbrooke during his time as a Special Envoy for Afghanistan and Pakistan. Ms Mariott was appointed the British High Commissioner to Kenya, an announcement made on 13 June 2019 and took up the role from Mr. Nic Hailey. She was the first female UK High Commissioner to Kenya. She commenced her duties in the Summer of 2019.

Honours
 Officer of the Most Excellent Order of the British Empire - 2004

References

1976 births
Living people
Members of HM Diplomatic Service
Alumni of University College, Durham
Alumni of Darwin College, Cambridge
21st-century British diplomats
British women ambassadors